Edgar Valter (21 September 1929, Tallinn – 4 March 2006, Tartu) was an Estonian graphic artist, caricaturist, writer and illustrator of children's books, with over 250 books to his name, through 55 years of activity (1950–2005). His most famous work is Pokuraamat (The Poku Book).

Life 

Edgar Valter was born on 21 September 1929, in Tallinn, the fourth child of 
a family of eight kids. He completed middle-school in 1945, but didn't graduate from Secondary School.

He began working as a freelance artist in 1950, eventually illustrating some of the most famous Estonian children literature characters, including the Krõll, the Naksitrallid, the Sipsik, and the Kunksmoor. Edgar Valter illustrated over 250 books, most of them being books for children. His caricatures were published by many journals and newspapers. Edgar Valter worked for the magazines  Hea Laps (a good kid),
Täheke (a star), Pioneer, and Pikker (a humor and satire magazine published during soviet times).

Edgar Valter lived his last 15 years in the Pöörismäe farm, located at the Urvaste rural municipality of the Võrumaa County. He died on 4 March 2006. His remains were cremated and buried on 17 May 2006 at Metsakalmistu in Tallinn.

The Poku Book and Pokus 
First published in 1994, Pokuraamat (The Poku Book) tells the tale of Pokus. A poku is a grass mound that grows in south-eastern Estonian bogs. In the book, Valter interprets pokus as animated childlike creatures, the grass actually being their golden head hair, which grows down to their feet. Its central theme is emphasizing the need to respect and to live in harmony with nature.

Pokuraamat was the first book that was both written and illustrated by Edgar Valter. In 1996, the book won the prestigious Nukits Competition award for best children book of the year. Edgar Valter wrote two subsequent Poku-related books after that: Pokuaabits (The Poku ABC) (2002) and Pokulood (Poku Stories) (2004).

Pokuland

In Rebaste village (Kanepi Parish), the Pokuland is opened. Pokuland is a thematic park where almost everything is related to Pokus.

Bibliography 
Selected titles

Jahikoera memuaarid (1974; 2004)
Pokuraamat (The Poku Book, 1994; 2001; 2005)
Ahaa, kummitab (1995)
Kassike ja kakuke (1995)
Lugu lahkest lohe Justusest ja printses Miniminnist (The Story of the Nice Dragon Iustus and the Princess Minimin, 1995)
Kullast vilepill (1996)
Isand Tuutu ettevõtmised (1997)
Iika (1998)
Pintselsabad (The Brushtails, 1998)
Metsa pühapäev (1999)
Kuidas õppida vaatama? (How Can You Learn to See? 2000)
Ho-ho-hoo! (2002)
Pokuaabits (The Poku ABC, 2002)
Natuke naljakad pildid (2003)
Pokulood (Poku Stories, 2004)
Ikka veel kummitab (2005)
Maalid 1983–2005 (2007). Selected paintings.
Karikatuurid läbi aegade (2011). Caricatures through time.
Lasteraamatute illustratsioonid 1948–2005 (2014). Children book illustrations.

Translations 
Poku Stories
 Lithuanian: Puokių istorijos, 2014
 Udmurt: Пукейлэн мадёсъёсыз, 2010

The Poku Book
 Udmurt: Покъёс сярысь лыдзет, 2010
 Lithuanian: Puokiai, 2008
 Russian: Поки, 1995 (Таллинн); 2014 (Москва)

Awards 
 1991 Meie Mats.
 1995 Annual Children's Literature Award of the Cultural Endowment of Estonia (The Poku Book)
 1996 Nukits Competition, 1st place for writing and illustrations (The Poku Book)
 1996 Albu Parish's A. T. Tammsaare Award for Literature, special prize (The Poku Book)
 2000 Nukits Competition, 2nd place (The Brushtails)
 2001 The Estonian National Culture Foundation's award for lifetime achievement
 2001 Order of the White Star, 3rd Class
 2002 The Eerik Kumari Nature Conservation Award
 2006 Nukits Competition, 2nd place (Poku Stories)

References

External links 
 Incomplete illustrated bibliography (in Estonian)
 The Project Pokuland (in English and Estonian). Includes photos, sample art work, and more information about Edgar Valter.
 Paintings  (in English and Estonian).
 Edgar Valter's 84th Birthday Google Doodles, 2012
 Blog dedicated to Edgar Valter's illustrations Many art samples from his books and other publications (in Estonian)

1929 births
2006 deaths
Artists from Tallinn
Writers from Tallinn
Estonian illustrators
Estonian children's writers
Estonian children's book illustrators
Recipients of Meie Mats
20th-century Estonian writers
20th-century male writers
21st-century Estonian writers
21st-century male writers
Estonian male writers
Recipients of the Order of the White Star, 3rd Class